WFVX-LD (channel 22) is a low-power television station in Bangor, Maine, United States, affiliated with Fox and MyNetworkTV. It is owned by Rockfleet Broadcasting alongside ABC affiliate WVII-TV (channel 7). Both stations share studios on Target Industrial Circle in West Bangor, while WFVX-LD's transmitter is located on Black Cap Mountain along the Penobscot and Hancock county line.

Although identifying as a station in its own right, WFVX-LD is officially licensed as a translator of WVII-TV. In addition to its own digital signal, WFVX-LD is simulcast in high definition on WVII-TV's second digital subchannel (virtual and VHF channel 7.2) from a separate transmitter on Black Cap Mountain. WVII-TV, in turn, is simulcast on WFVX-LD's second digital subchannel for a UHF simulcast.

In addition to Fox programming, WFVX-LD is a secondary affiliate of MyNetworkTV, and airs Jewelry Television overnight. As a low-power station, WFVX-LD's main signal has very little penetration outside the immediate Bangor area. However, it is carried on cable and satellite television as far away as Skowhegan and Bar Harbor; additionally, its carriage on the WVII-TV subchannel gives the station full-market over-the-air coverage.

History
A construction permit for a low-power station on channel 22 in Bangor was granted on January 12, 1995, and was assigned the call letters W22BU. Following the death of original owner Dale Buschow in 1998, the station was acquired by MS Communications on January 3, 2001; its license to cover was issued on March 1. MS Communications had plans to establish wireless cable networks, but never broadcast anything other than test patterns on its stations. MS sold W22BU to Rockfleet Broadcasting, owner of WVII-TV, in 2003. Rockfleet put the station on the air as a Fox affiliate on April 13, 2003; the following day, the call letters were changed to WFVX-LP. The WFVX call letters were transferred from what is now WFUP, the Vanderbilt, Michigan satellite of then-sister station and fellow Fox affiliate WFQX-TV in Cadillac, Michigan.

Before WFVX went on the air, Fox programming was seen on cable via WPXT in Portland, then from Foxnet after WPXT switched to The WB in the fall of 2001. Fox Sports programming was also available in Bangor at various points via WABI-TV (channel 5), WBGR-LP (channel 33), and WCKD-LP (channel 30). WCKD was WVII's first venture into low-power broadcasting in Bangor; it signed a local marketing agreement with James McLeod, owner of channel 30 (then known as W30BF, the former Bangor transmitter for Maine Public Television Plus) and WBGR, in 2000, and relaunched it as a UPN affiliate in 2001. WCKD had tried to become a full Fox affiliate that October to coincide with WPXT's affiliation change, but was blocked from doing so by UPN; this did not stop the station from continuing its existing relationship with Fox Sports. After WFVX's sign on, Rockfleet moved all of WCKD's syndicated and local programming (including a 10 p.m. newscast from WVII and the morning talk show So Goes the Nation), but not the UPN affiliation, to channel 22.

On December 6, 2006, WFVX added a secondary affiliation with Fox's new sister programming service MyNetworkTV. The service was not available in Bangor in its first three months on the air. Currently, programming from MyNetworkTV is seen in a delayed manner from 11:05 until 1:05 early the next morning. There is no local branding and/or logo indicating the secondary MyNetworkTV affiliation status aside from network promotions.

As a low-power station, WFVX was exempt from the digital transition on June 12, 2009; however, on February 17, WVII added a new second digital subchannel to carry WFVX's programming. WFVX has a construction permit to perform a "flash-cut" from analog to digital on the channel 22. On January 23, 2013, the station's call letters was changed to WFVX-LD ("LD" stands for low-powered digital).

On February 28, 2022, WFVX and WVII temporarily changed their logos to blue and yellow, the colors of the Ukrainian flag, in support of Ukraine after the 2022 Russian invasion.

Programming
There is little in the way of local programming on WFVX. A weekday morning talk show, So Goes the Nation, was met with little success. This program was hosted by Charlie Horne and Alan Silberberg from the WFVX studios in Bangor. Originally launched on WCKD-LP in 2002, it moved to WFVX upon its launch, and subsequently added simulcasts on WPFO and WLOB radio in Portland. The broadcast was a three-hour call-in talk show until September 2004 when it was reduced to a single hour before being canceled altogether in November of that year.

WFVX carried Shop at Home overnights until its closure in March 2008; Jewelry Television was added at that time. Since August 2008, WFVX and WVII have also carried programming from the New England Patriots Television Network; the stations split airings of pre-season games, and WFVX airs Patriots All Access, produced out of Boston's WBZ-TV, Sunday mornings at 11 during the NFL season. Starting in November 2009, WFVX began airing IWE: Championship Wrestling every Saturday night; it has since been dropped.

In June 2013, WFVX and WVII reached a deal to carry Husson University sports. This was followed a month later with a deal to carry University of Maine sports; as a result, WFVX and WVII replace WABI-TV as the television flagship of the Black Bear Sports Network. As part of the deal, Black Bear sports telecasts will also be seen on Fox College Sports, and production will be handled by Pack Network (WABI had produced its telecasts in-house).

News operation

WVII produces a weeknight hour-long prime time newscast on WFVX called Fox 22 News at 10, as well as a 7 a.m. newscast under the name The 7 AM News Hour on Fox 22. WFVX also simulcasts WVII's 6:30 a.m. newscast, Good Morning Maine. The 10 p.m. newscast was originally a half-hour long, but was expanded on June 25, 2012. The morning newscast launched on September 7, 2011. Since September 2012, WFVX also airs a half-hour 10 p.m. weekend newscast.

WVII began taping the 10 p.m. newscast earlier in the evening on October 16, 2006, though the sports report was still seen live on Fridays so that game highlights and scores from high school football games could still be featured. As of September 2011, WFVX has resumed airing a live newscast at 10.

WVII currently contracts with AccuWeather to produce the station's forecasts. The segments are recorded in advance with rotating meteorologists and fed via satellite to Bangor from AccuWeather's headquarters in State College, Pennsylvania (which is occasionally referred to as the "Fox 22 Weather Center" on WFVX). As a result, the station may not cover all severe weather events or be too late in doing so when conditions warrant.

Subchannels
The station's digital signal is multiplexed:

References

External links
 

Television channels and stations established in 2003
2003 establishments in Maine
FVX-LD
Fox network affiliates
MyNetworkTV affiliates
ABC network affiliates
Low-power television stations in the United States